Gallus, Carolus (or Karel de Haan) (16 August 1530 in Arnhem – 28 January 1616 in Nijbroek) was a Reformed minister and polemicist against the Anabaptists. Native to the Netherlands, Gallus was raised in a Roman Catholic family, and studied law and theology to become a priest.

Life

As a Roman Catholic preparing to study for the priesthood, and against the warnings of his friend Joannes Visser, Carolus Gallus chose to study theology under John Calvin and Theodore de Beze at the Genevan Academy.

In early 1560, he became a priest at Deventer, though by February 1561, he was sued by dean of Deventer and brought under charges of heresy due to his administration of the Eucharist during a Christmas Mass. The city kept him in his position until June 1561, when he fled to the city of Hamm. He was appointed as Evangelical pastor by the Duke of Cleves and remained in this position until 1576. He moved to Bremen for a brief time and became a bitter opponent to the Anabaptists. He published his first book against the Anabaptists entitled  (Bremen, 1577 ?).  From 1578 to 1581, at the behest of Count Johan Nassau, he was a military chaplain with his friend Johannes Fontanus in Gelderland, where the Reformation was beginning to take hold.

Between the years of 1583 and 1586, he ministered once again in Deventer, but once again had to flee as Roman Catholics from Spain who infiltrated the city. He was appointed as professor of theology at the University of Leiden in 1587 and maintained this position rather shortly, as he took a call to become minister in Oldenbroek in 1592, where he remained until his death.

Chief works

. Bremen, 1577(?).
: . 1577.
. 1592.
. Apoc. 22 vers 10. Lugd. Bat. 1592.
. Ferrariae, Apud Victorium Baldinum, 1600.
. Arnhem: Jan Janssen, 1606.
. Franeker, 1642.

References

Dyck, Cornelius J. and Dennis D. Martin. The Mennonite Encyclopedia. 5 vols. Scottdale: Mennonite Publishing House, 1955–1990.
 Knipscheer  Gallus (Carolus) in Sijthoff, A.W., et al. . 10 vols. Leiden: Sijthoff, 1911–1937.

1530 births
1616 deaths
16th-century Dutch people
Anabaptism
16th-century Dutch Calvinist and Reformed ministers
Dutch Calvinist and Reformed theologians
People from Arnhem